Warwick John Hadfield OAM is an Australian sports journalist, songwriter and poet.

Hadfield was born in Sydney. In 1997, he moved to Geelong when his wife Alison Hadfield took up a senior management role at Deakin University.

After completing high school, he spent ten years working in the New South Wales public service. His love of sport led to Hadfield to working for local Sutherland Shire newspapers and the AAP, covering grade cricket in Sydney. He moved to England and worked for the The Daily Telegraph covering sport. On returning to Australia, Hadfield was employed as a journalist with The Australian in the 1980's and early 1990's and held the positions of Chief of Staff, Editorial Writer and Chief Sports Correspondent. He covered major international sporting events involving Australian athletes and teamsincluding the Olympic Games, Commonwealth Games, international cricket and rugby union. Between 1992 to 1997, he was employed as Marketing Manager for ABC Tasmania. Since 1996, he has been with ABC Radio National including The Sports Factor presenter and RN Breakfast sports editor and presenter.

Hadfield was Geelong Football Club communications manager for three years. He has volunteered his expertise to several Geelong organisations -  Newtown and Chilwell Cricket Club and Friends of Barwon Side Quarry in terms of administration and publicity.

Hadfield stated that "Mentorship from cricket commentary doyen Richie Benaud and learning respect from legendary AFL coach Kevin Sheedy" had inspired his sport journalism career.

He founded the musical group Dancing with Socrates and it has released three EPs. Hadfield's book 'Never Short Of A Word' contains a collection of his writing including short stories and poems.

In 2019, Hadfield was awarded OAM for service to broadcast media as a journalist.

Books
 Cricket rebels by Chris Harte and Warwick Hadfield, Sydney, QB Books, 1985.
 Sporting diets by Warwick Hadfield. Sydney, Lilyfield Publishers, 1987.
 Never short of a word by Warwick Hadfield. Self published, 2012.
 Sheeds: follow your dreams by Kevin Sheedy with Warwick Hadfield, Melbourne, Crown Content, 2001.
 The 500 club: footy's greatest coaches by Kevin Sheedy with Warwick Hadfield. Melbourne, News Custom Publishing, 2004.
 The long march: reflections from a lifetime in football by Kevin Sheedy with Warwick Hadfield. Melbiurne, Slattery, 2013.

References

Living people
Australian sports journalists
ABC radio (Australia) journalists and presenters
Recipients of the Medal of the Order of Australia
Australian songwriters
Australian writers
People from Geelong
Year of birth missing (living people)